The 1938 Central Michigan Bearcats football team represented Central Michigan College of Education, later renamed Central Michigan University, as an independent during the 1938 college football season. In their second season under head coach Ron Finch, the Bearcats compiled a 7–1 record, shut out five of eight opponents, held seven opponents to fewer than seven points, and outscored their opponents by a combined total of 270 to 44. The team's sole loss was by a 35–0 score to Western State.

Schedule

References

Central Michigan
Central Michigan Chippewas football seasons
Central Michigan Bearcats football